Peter Ryan (born 23 March 1971) is an Australian former rugby league and rugby union footballer who played in the 1990s and 2000s. A Queensland State of Origin representative forward, he played ten seasons with the Brisbane Broncos and finished his career playing rugby union for the ACT Brumbies.

Biography
Ryan attended Downlands College in Toowoomba. After representing Australia in rugby union as a schoolboy, he first played rugby league for Wattles Warriors in the TRL (Toowoomba Rugby League), before playing for the Brisbane Rugby League premiership's Western Suburbs club, Ryan moved to the Broncos in 1990.

Professional playing career
In the weeks following Brisbane's inaugural premiership win Ryan travelled with the club to England, where he played from the interchange bench in the 1992 World Club Challenge against British champions Wigan, helping Brisbane become the first NSWRL club to win the match in Britain. A handy utility forward, the following season he was part of Brisbane's 1993 Winfield Cup triumph.

During the 1994 NSWRL season, Ryan played from the interchange bench for defending premiers Brisbane when they hosted British champions Wigan for the 1994 World Club Challenge.  Also during the 1994 season, Ryan was suspended for three matches after being found guilty of biting South Sydney player Jason Bell.

In 1997 Ryan debuted for Queensland and was named Brisbane's player of the year in a premiership-winning season, Ryan's second title with the club. Only a suspension, which ruled him out of the 1998 NRL grand final, denied him the opportunity of winning a third premiership with the Broncos in 1998.

At the end of 1999, Ryan left the Brisbane club to play rugby union with the ACT Brumbies. Ryan was the first person in history to win grand finals in the NRL and the Super 12, as it was then known. This feat has since only been matched by Brad Thorn in 2008, and Will Chambers and Sonny Bill Williams in 2012.

During 2001's pre-season, Wendell Sailor declared he was "leaning towards" switching codes from rugby league to rugby union following advice from former Broncos teammate Ryan.

Post-playing
During the 2000s Ryan, who has been described by Craig Bellamy as "one of the most devastating defenders to have played the game", returned to the Brisbane Broncos as a part-time defence coach.

Renowned during his playing days for his tough and uncompromising tackling technique, Ryan 
was appointed as a 'contact' coach for the North Queensland Cowboys before switching to a similar role with the ACT Brumbies rugby union team in Super Rugby.

He was signed as defensive coach of the Queensland Reds for the 2019 season.

References

External links
Peter Ryan stats at rugbyleagueproject.com

1971 births
Living people
Australian rugby league players
Australian rugby league coaches
Rugby league players from Ipswich, Queensland
Wests Panthers players
Brisbane Broncos players
Queensland Rugby League State of Origin players
Australian rugby union players
Australian rugby union coaches
ACT Brumbies players
Rugby league second-rows
Rugby league locks